The 2000 South Australian National Football League (SANFL) Grand Final saw the Central District Bulldogs defeat the Woodville-West Torrens by 22 points to claim the club's first ever premiership.

The match was played on Sunday 10 September 2000 at Football Park in front of a crowd of 34,819.

Goals: 
3 – Stuart Dew 
3 – Daniel Healy 
1 – Kynan Ford 
1 – James Gowans

References 

SANFL Grand Finals
Sanfl Grand Final, 2000